Hoseynabad-e Sofla may refer to:
 Hoseynabad-e Sofla, Kerman
 Hoseynabad-e Sofla, Rafsanjan, Kerman Province
 Hoseynabad-e Sofla, Mazandaran
 Hoseynabad-e Sofla, Kohgiluyeh and Boyer-Ahmad
 Hoseynabad-e Sofla, Sistan and Baluchestan

See also
 Hoseynabad-e Pain (disambiguation)